Serafim Ponte Grande is the main character of a novel with the same name written by the Brazilian writer Oswald de Andrade. It was first published in 1933.

1933 novels
Brazilian novels